Province of Bosnia may refer to:

 Ottoman Empire's provinces of Bosnia:
 Sanjak of Bosnia (1463–1520)
 Eyalet of Bosnia (1520–1864)
 Vilayet of Bosnia (1864–1908)
 Austria-Hungary's Condominium of Bosnia and Herzegovina (1878–1918)

Province name disambiguation pages